The Scaphiophryninae are a subfamily of microhylid frogs native to Madagascar.

Description
They are terrestrial. Species living in drier environments are burrowers that emerge at the start of the rainy season. However, at least Scaphiophryne gottlebei is also able to climb vertical rock faces. Breeding is explosive and takes place in temporary pools. Eggs float on the surface and hatch into free-living tadpoles.

Genera
Scaphiophryninae contains two genera.
 Paradoxophyla Blommers-Schlösser & Blanc, 1991 — 2 species
 Scaphiophryne Boulenger, 1882 — 9 species

References

Microhylidae
Endemic fauna of Madagascar
Taxa named by Raymond Laurent
Amphibian subfamilies